Borkovići is a village in the municipality of Banja Luka, Republika Srpska, Bosnia and Herzegovina.

Demographics
Ethnic groups in the village include:
587 Serbs (98.82%)
7 Others (1.18%)

References

Villages in Republika Srpska
Populated places in Banja Luka